Gail Ann Dorsey (born November 20, 1962) is an American musician. With a long career as a session musician mainly on bass guitar, she is perhaps best known for her lengthy residency in David Bowie's band, from 1995 to Bowie's death in 2016. Aside from playing bass, she sang lead vocals on live versions of "Under Pressure" (taking the part originally sung by Queen  frontman Freddie Mercury) and dueted with Bowie on other songs, including "The London Boys", "Aladdin Sane (1913–1938–197?)", "I Dig Everything", accompanying Bowie on clarinet, and a cover of Laurie Anderson's "O Superman". 
From 1993 to 1996, Dorsey also recorded and toured with Tears for Fears, and collaborated on songwriting with the band. She appeared in several of the band's promo videos throughout this period.

Her diverse range of work includes performances and recordings with, among others, The National, Lenny Kravitz, Bryan Ferry, Boy George, the Indigo Girls, Khaled, Jane Siberry, The The, Skin, Gwen Stefani, Charlie Watts, Seal, Gang of Four, Susan Werner, Ani DiFranco and Dar Williams.

In addition, Dorsey has released three solo albums: The Corporate World (1988), Rude Blue (1992), and I Used To Be... (2003).

Early life 
Dorsey grew up in the 1970s in West Philadelphia. She played guitar from the age of nine and cites Mark Farner of Grand Funk Railroad, Terry Kath of Chicago, Jimi Hendrix, and Nancy Wilson of Heart as early influences. She acquired a bass guitar shortly after her 14th birthday but did not consider herself a bass player until she was 20. She also wrote feature-length screenplays to accompany some of her musical compositions.

Dorsey attended the California Institute of the Arts in the School of Film and Video. Her screenplays and short Super 8 films earned her a full scholarship. Dorsey was the only woman in her freshman class and the youngest woman to be admitted to the Live Action department up to that point. After completing three semesters she felt unsuited for the film industry and once again turned to a career in music.

Career 
At the age of 22, Dorsey moved to London to pursue her musical career, where she was in a musical collaboration/band 20To with keyboard player/composer Pete Stern. Their first demos were engineered and produced by Paul "Doc" Stewart at Village Way Studio in London. Stewart was responsible for their introduction to CBS Records, which led to her first recording deal. She also composed the music for the Theatre of Black Women play Chiaroscuro in 1985, and was in the band for the show. She then established herself through collaborations with artists such as Boy George, Ann Pigalle, and Donny Osmond. Dorsey's first high-profile job was as a guest vocalist in the original line up of The Charlie Watts Big Band and its 1985 premiere at London's famous West End jazz club, Ronnie Scott's. An important point in Dorsey's solo career was her appearance on The Tube, a weekly music television hosted by Jools Holland and Paula Yates. She sang on the 1986 world jazz album The Song of Many Tongues by Grand Union Orchestra, written by Tony Haynes.

In December 1987, Dorsey signed with Warner Music Group and in 1988 released her first solo album, The Corporate World. The album was produced by bassist Nathan East of the jazz quartet Fourplay and included appearances by artists such as Eric Clapton. It received a five-star review and was voted one of the Top 50 Albums of the Year by London's Q magazine.
She moved to Island Records in 1991, signed by founder Chris Blackwell. In 1992, she released her second solo album entitled Rude Blue, which featured trumpeter Mark Pender and trombonist Richie "La Bamba" (from Conan O'Brien's house band), Carla Azar on drums (from Wendy & Lisa), Carol Steele on percussion, and the famous James Brown  horn section of Maceo Parker, Fred Wesley, and Alfred "Pee Wee" Ellis. After almost 12 years in England, Dorsey relocated to the artist community of Woodstock in upstate New York in 1994.

When her relationship with Island became strained, Dorsey began to concentrate on session work and in 1995 was recruited for David Bowie's Outside Tour. Throughout the remainder of the 1990s and into the 21st century she performed and recorded with artists such as Gang of Four, Louise Goffin, world music stars Rachid Taha, Faudel, and Khaled (on their live album 1, 2, 3 Soleils), Sophie B. Hawkins, Tears For Fears, The The, The Indigo Girls, Canadian artist Jane Siberry, Jeffrey Gaines, Italian blues man Zucchero, Dar Williams, Catie Curtis, Toshi Reagon, Joan Osborne, The B-52s, and Michael Hutchence of INXS.

Dorsey is perhaps best known for her contribution to the David Bowie band. After the Outside Tour she provided vocals and bass for Earthling (1997), Heathen (2002), Reality (2003) and The Next Day (2013). She recorded "Planet of Dreams", a duet with Bowie on the 1997 EMI UK benefit CD release, Long Live Tibet, as well as several other live recordings and videos. She was on board for the last six tours
 and performed with Bowie at "The Concert For New York" at Madison Square Garden. About a decade after Rude Blue, Dorsey released her third solo album in 2003. The album entitled I Used To Be is a collection of previously unreleased material spanning the past 18 years of Dorsey's songwriting archives. She wrote all songs herself with the exception of a few collaborators, namely Roland Orzabal and singer-songwriter Kristen Hall. I Used To Be was produced by Dorsey and engineer/producer Brandon Mason, with long-time friend and fellow bassist Sara Lee as executive producer. In 2017, Dorsey joined the Celebrating David Bowie tour from January 2, 2017, to February 2, 2017, alongside other musicians and collaborators of David Bowie.

Style and influences 
Dorsey's musical style has a broad span and incorporates rock, funk, country, and pop influences. She describes her current sound as a present-day version of the AM/FM radio tunes that left a mark on her music such as The Fifth Dimension, Olivia Newton-John, Bread and Heart. When asked to describe her sound in one word she says "Black-arach...but that's maybe how I feel most days. Sometimes you can never tell what vehicle is required to deliver the message until it tells you. I don't want to limit myself to anything. I just want to maintain honesty and substance in the work. That is my responsibility to the music and the audience." Gail uses a Music Man Stingray bass guitar and a Fender Jazz Bass mostly, during her touring and studio efforts.

In December 2021, Bass Player magazine gave Dorsey a Lifetime Achievement Award.

Discography

Solo 
 1988: The Corporate World (Sire Records) – with Eric Clapton, Nathan East, Gavin Harrison, Anne Dudley, Carol Kenyon, Katie Kissoon, Tessa Niles, etc.
 1992: Rude Blue (Island Records)
 2004: I Used to Be (Sad Bunny Records)

Gang of Four 
 1991: Mall – Gail Ann: bass, backing vocals
 2015: What Happens Next – Gail Ann: vocals on "First World Citizen"

The The 
 1995: Hanky Panky – Gail Ann: bass

Tears for Fears 
 1995: Raoul and the Kings of Spain – Gail Ann: bass and participation in the writing of "Queen of Compromise"

David Bowie 
 Studio albums 
 1997: Earthling – Gail Ann: bass, backing vocals
 2002: Heathen – Gail Ann: bass on "Conversation Piece"
 2003: Reality – Gail Ann: backing vocals
 2013: The Next Day – Gail Ann shares bassist position with Tony Levin, being present on bass on 8 songs and on backing vocals on 7

 Live albums 
 2000: LiveAndWell.com – Gail Ann: bass, keyboards, backing vocals
 2000: Bowie at the Beeb – Gail Ann: bass, guitars, backing vocals on CD 3
 2009: VH1 Storytellers – Gail Ann: bass, backing vocals
 2010: A Reality Tour – Gail Ann: bass, backing vocals
 2018: Glastonbury 2000 – Gail Ann: bass, backing vocals

 Compilation 
 2022: Toy – Gail Ann: bass, clarinet, backing vocals

 EP 
 2020: Is It Any Wonder? - David Bowie EP recorded during the Earthling album sessions; Gail Ann is present on 5 of the 6 titles of the EP

Rachid Taha/Khaled/Faudel 
 1999: 1,2,3 Suns – Gail Ann: bass, backing vocals; Steve Hillage of the band Gong produced the album and played guitar

Collaborations 
1990: Bloodletting by Concrete Blonde – Gail Ann: bass on "Tomorrow, Wendy"

References

External links 

[ AllMusic entry]
Official website

1962 births
Living people
American women rock singers
Women bass guitarists
Sire Records artists
Indigo Girls members
The The members
Singers from Pennsylvania
California Institute of the Arts alumni
Guitarists from Philadelphia
Gang of Four (band) members
21st-century American women singers
20th-century American bass guitarists
African-American rock musicians
21st-century American singers
20th-century American women guitarists
African-American women singers
African-American guitarists
African American female guitarists